Alexander "Sandy" Main (born 1873) was a Scottish professional footballer and middle-distance runner. Born in West Calder, West Lothian, Main started his career with his hometown club. He later played for fellow Scottish sides Rangers, Hibernian and Motherwell, as well as English clubs Woolwich Arsenal and Watford. He spent most of his career as a forward, but played predominantly as a right half at Watford.

Main scored two goals in Arsenal's biggest ever win, a 12–0 Football League victory against Loughborough on 12 March 1900.

References

External links 
Alex Main, www.ihibs.co.uk

1873 births
Year of death missing
Association football forwards
Scottish male middle-distance runners
Scottish footballers
Southern Football League players
Rangers F.C. players
Hibernian F.C. players
Arsenal F.C. players
Motherwell F.C. players
Watford F.C. players
Scottish Football League players
English Football League players
Footballers from West Lothian